Robert Alexander Childress (born September 26, 1968) is a baseball coach and former pitcher, who is the current director of player development for the Nebraska Cornhuskers. He played college baseball at Northwood from 1987 to 1990. He then served as head coach of the Texas A&M Aggies (2006–2021).

Playing career
Childress attended Harmony High School in Harmony, Texas. He was then recruited to Northwood University, where he would continue his athletic career as a pitcher, twice earning all-conference honors.

Coaching career

Assistant coach
During his eight years as pitching coach with Nebraska (1998–2005), the Cornhuskers advanced to the NCAA Tournament five times, reached the Super Regionals four times, and the College World Series three times.  He helped construct the Nebraska pitching staff into one of the best in the nation, posting the top five single-season strikeout records in Nebraska history.  His last season at Nebraska, his staff finished with an ERA of 2.69, ranking in the top five nationally and best in the Big 12.

Before joining the Nebraska staff, he served as pitching coach at Northwestern State University from 1995 to 1997.

Texas A&M
Childress was hired in 2005 by Texas A&M to be the head coach of the Aggie baseball team. His second season as head coach, Childress led the Aggies to a Big 12 Tournament Championship and a trip to the NCAA Super Regionals. His team continued to improve in the 2008 season, as the Aggies won the Big 12 Championship and returned to the NCAA Super Regionals, earning Childress the Big 12 Coach of the Year award.

In his fourth season, however, the team began the season ranked #1 nationally in a few preseason polls, though were eliminated in regional play.

In 2011, Rob Childress led the Aggies to a Big 12 regular season co-championship and a  Big 12 Tournament championship.  The Aggies would advance through the NCAA Super Regionals against Florida State to advance to the College World Series.

Following a 2021 season that saw the Aggies finish in last place in the SEC, Athletics Director Ross Bjork, announced that the school would not renew Childress' contract for 2022. Childress's 622 victories ranked 3rd in school history at the time of his dismissal.

Head coaching record

References

External links
Rob Childress bio

1968 births
Living people
Texarkana Bulldogs baseball coaches
Northwestern State Demons baseball coaches
Northwood University alumni
Northwood Knights baseball coaches
Northwood Knights baseball players
Nebraska Cornhuskers baseball coaches
Texas A&M Aggies baseball coaches
Texas A&M University–Commerce alumni
People from Gilmer, Texas